Simon Ok Hyun-jin (born March 5, 1968) is the 6th Archbishop of Gwangju.

Biography
Ok was ordained a priest on January 26, 1994.

On May 12, 2011, Pope Benedict XVI appointed him Auxiliary Bishop of Gwangju and Titular Bishop of Pederodiana. He was consecrated bishop on July 6, 2011 by Hyginus Kim Hee-jong, Archbishop of Gwangju. Co-consecrators were Andreas Choi Chang-mou,  Archbishop Emeritus of Gwangju; Peter Kang U-il, Bishop of Cheju; and Victorinus Youn Kong-hi, Archbishop Emeritus of Gwangju.

References

South Korean Roman Catholic bishops
1968 births
Living people
People from Gwangju
Bishops appointed by Pope Benedict XVI
Roman Catholic bishops of Gwangju